Koinon (pl. Κοινά, Koina), meaning "common", in the sense of "public", had many interpretations, some societal, some governmental. The word was the neuter form of the adjective, roughly equivalent in the governmental sense to Latin res publica, "the public thing". Among the most frequent uses is "commonwealth", the government of a single state, such as the Athenian.

Frequent in the historical writings is a sense of "league" or "federation" an association of distinct city-states in a sympoliteia. As government of a league, koinon comprised such functions as defense, diplomacy, economics, and religious practices among its member states. The word was carried over to other political associations in mediaeval and modern Greek history.

In Epirus itself there had in ancient times existed the Koinon of the Molossians. There was a Lacedaemonian League(κοινὸν τῶν Λακεδαιμονίων), centred on Sparta and its old dominions for a period under Roman rule, a Koinon of the Macedonians, also under Roman rule. In modern Greek history, during the Greek War of Independence, a local self-government termed Koinon was set up in the islands of Hydra, Spetses and Psara.

Some federations termed Koinon were:
 Ionian League (Κοινὸν Ἰώνων, Koinon Ionon), formed in the 7th century BC
 Koinon of the Aeinautae, recorded on an inscription which was found in Eretria, island Euboea, dated to the 5th century BC
 Acarnanian League (Κοινὸν τῶν Ἀκαρνάνων, Koinon ton Akarnanon), existing 5th century BC to c. 30 BC, with interruptions
 Chalcidian League (Κοινὸν τῶν Χαλκιδέων, Koinon ton Chalkideon), existing c. 430 to 348 BC
 Phocian League (Κοινὸν τῶν Φωκέων, Koinon ton Phokeon), existing 6th century BC to 3rd century AD, with interruptions
 Thessalian League (Κοινὸν τῶν Θεσσάλων, Koinon ton Thessalon), existing 363 BC to 3rd century AD, with interruptions
 League of the Magnetes (Κοινὸν τῶν Μαγνητῶν, Koinon ton Magneton), existing 197 BC to 3rd century AD, with interruptions
 Aenianian League (Κοινὸν τῶν Αἰνάνων, Koinon ton Ainianon)
 Arcadian League (Koinon ton Arkadon)
 League of the Oeteans (Κοινὸν τῶν Οἰταίων, Koinon ton Oitaion)
 Euboean League (Κοινὸν τῶν Εὐβοιέων, Koinon ton Euboieon)
 Epirote League (Κοινὸν τῶν Ἠπειρωτῶν Koinon Epiroton), existing from c. 320 to c. 170 BC
 League of the Islanders (Κοινὸν τῶν Νησιωτῶν, Koinon ton Nesioton), existing from c. 314 to c. 220 BC and 200 to 168 BC
 Cretan League under the Roman Empire to the 4th century
 Koinon of Macedonians existing from 3rd century to Roman period
 Lycian League, founded in 168 BC
 League of Free Laconians, a league of cities in Laconia established by Roman emperor Augustus in 21 BC
 Koinon of the Zagorisians under the Ottoman Empire, 1670–1868
 Aetolian League (Κοινὸν τῶν Αἰτώλων, Koinon ton Aitolon), early 3rd century BC to roughly 189 BC when it came under Roman influence
 Achaean League (Κοινὸν τῶν Ἀχαιῶν, Koinon ton Achaion), 280 BC to 146 BC, dissolved by the Romans after the Battle of Corinth (146 BC)
 Koinon galaton, the Galatian League in Asia Minor

See also
 Sympoliteia

References

 
Greek words and phrases